Thilanga Udeshana (born 13 March 1998) is a Sri Lankan cricketer. He made his first-class debut for Tamil Union Cricket and Athletic Club in the 2017–18 Premier League Tournament on 8 December 2017. He made his Twenty20 debut for Tamil Union Cricket and Athletic Club in the 2018–19 SLC Twenty20 Tournament on 21 February 2019. He made his List A debut for Tamil Union Cricket and Athletic Club in the 2018–19 Premier Limited Overs Tournament on 12 March 2019.

References

External links
 

1998 births
Living people
Sri Lankan cricketers
Tamil Union Cricket and Athletic Club cricketers
Place of birth missing (living people)